The Return of the Soldier is a 1928 play by the British writer John Van Druten. It is an adaptation of Rebecca West's 1918 novel of the same title about a shell shocked officer returning from the First World War with amnesia who is no longer in love with his wife.

It was staged at the Playhouse Theatre in the West End, running for 46 performances. The cast included Cyril Raymond, Aubrey Mather, Eliot Makeham, Mary Clare and Grizelda Hervey.

References

Bibliography
 J. P. Wearing. The London Stage 1920-1929: A Calendar of Productions, Performers, and Personnel. Rowman & Littlefield, 2014.

1928 plays
Plays by John Van Druten
West End plays